Dave Henderson (born March 3, 1952) is a Canadian-born ice hockey coach and a former French-national player. He represented France at the C Pool of the 1981 World Ice Hockey Championships in Beijing.

Henderson is the long-time head coach of the France men's national ice hockey team and the father of Brian Henderson.

References

Living people
1952 births
Ice hockey people from Winnipeg
Canadian ice hockey coaches
Canadian ice hockey forwards
French ice hockey players